There are numerous parks throughout the sovereign island country of Singapore. This is a list of parks in Singapore that are currently existing and have articles on Wikipedia. Parks in Singapore are managed by the National Parks Board or NParks. Most of these parks are connected via the Park Connector Network (PCN).

See also
 Park Connector Network (PCN)

External links

National Parks Board (NParks)

Singapore
 
Parks
Parks
Parks
Singapore